Visio Corporation was a software company based in Seattle, Washington, USA. Its principal product was a diagramming application software of the same name. It was acquired by Microsoft and is now in a division of that company, which continues to develop the application under the name Microsoft Visio.

History
Axon Corporation was incorporated May 1, 1989, shortly after Jeremy Jaech left Aldus. Later, in summer 1990, Jeremy Jaech and Ted Johnson met to come up with the initial product definition and then in the fall of 1990 recruited Dave Walter as their third founder. All of its founders came from Aldus Corporation: Jeremy Jaech and Dave Walter were two of Aldus's original founders, and Ted Johnson was the lead developer of Aldus PageMaker for Windows.

In 1992, before it had released a single product, the company changed its name to Shapeware. It finally released its first application, Visio, in November of that year.

When Shapeware released Visio 4.0 on August 18, 1995, it was one of the first applications developed specifically for Windows 95.

In November 1995, Shapeware changed its own name to Visio and on November 9, 1995, marked its initial public offering of stock under the ticker VSIO.

On January 7, 2000, Microsoft Corporation acquired Visio in a stock swap. Microsoft gave Visio shareholders 0.45 Microsoft shares for each Visio share. Based on the value of Microsoft stock when the deal closed the trade was worth approximately US$1.5 billion. This was Microsoft's largest acquisition until they acquired aQuantive.

References

External links 
 Microsoft Visio history

Defunct software companies of the United States
Defunct companies based in Seattle
Software companies established in 1989
Software companies disestablished in 2000
2000 mergers and acquisitions
1989 establishments in Washington (state)
2000 disestablishments in Washington (state)